John Curzon Moore-Stevens (1818-1903), JP, DL, MP for North Devon, High Sheriff of Devon in 1870.

Moore-Stevens was the son and heir of Thomas Moore-Stevens (1782-1832). He had been brought up in the expectation of becoming the heir of John Rolle, 1st Baron Rolle (1750-1842), of Stevenstone, who died childless and was his great-grandmother's nephew. However, Lord Rolle instead left his fortune to Hon. Mark Trefusis, who changed his name to Mark Rolle (d. 1907), the nephew of his second wife Louisa Trefusis, a daughter of Baron Clinton. He married in 1850 Elizabeth Anne Johnson, daughter of Rev. Peter Johnson.

Moore-Stevens rebuilt Winscott in 1865, immediately following his inheritance. He served as a JP on the Quarter Sessions Court of Devon, and Winscott House was built with its own "Magistrate's Room" with a separate entrance. He was especially reactionary and old-fashioned and at the Mid-Summer sessions of 1882 had declared his object was "to get rid of traction-engines altogether". On the  abolition of the Quarter-Sessions in 1889 he was the only former JP to have been defeated by a non-magistrate in the elections for  councillors to the new replacement governing body of the Devon County Council.

References

1818 births
1903 deaths
UK MPs 1880–1885
Conservative Party (UK) MPs for English constituencies
English justices of the peace
High Sheriffs of Devon
Members of the Parliament of the United Kingdom for constituencies in Devon